The 1933 election for Mayor of Los Angeles took place on May 2, 1933, with a run-off election on June 6, 1933. Incumbent John Clinton Porter was defeated by Frank L. Shaw, a Los Angeles County Supervisor, in the runoff election. During the election, Shaw's citizenship was questions as his birth records could not be located.

Municipal elections in California, including Mayor of Los Angeles, are officially nonpartisan; candidates' party affiliations do not appear on the ballot.

Election 
Incumbent John Clinton Porter announced that he would be running for re-election. He was challenged by Los Angeles County Supervisor Frank L. Shaw, former Mayor George E. Cryer, and State Assemblymember Charles W. Dempster.
During the election, Shaw's citizenship came under question, as he had been born in Warwick, Ontario, Canada, and his birth records were not found. Because of his birth records, a complaint was filed to try and prevent him from becoming Mayor, asserting that he was still only a citizen of Canada and not a citizen of the United States. In the runoff election, Shaw beat Porter by a comfortable margin.

Results

Primary election

General election

References and footnotes

External links
 Office of the City Clerk, City of Los Angeles

1933
Los Angeles
1933 California elections
May 1933 events
June 1933 events
1933 in Los Angeles